Menegazzia stirtonii is a species of foliose lichen found in New Zealand, and Tasmania, Australia.

It was first described as Parmelia stirtonii in 1929 by Alexander Zahlbruckner.  In 2004 Gintaras Kantvilas and Simone Louwhoff transferred it to the genus Menegazzia.

See also
 List of Menegazzia species

References

]

stirtonii
Lichen species
Lichens described in 1929
Lichens of Australia
Lichens of New Zealand
Taxa named by Alexander Zahlbruckner